Baladiyah Al-Aziziya, officially the Al-Aziziya Sub-Municipality, is an urban baladiyah and one of 16 sub-municipalities of southern Riyadh, Saudi Arabia, which includes 6 neighborhoods and districts, partially including al-Mansourah and is responsible for their development, planning and maintenance.

Neighborhoods and districts 

 Al-Aziziyah
 Ad-Dar al-Baida
 Al-Misfat
 Taybah
 Al-Masani'
 Al Mansourah (partially)

References 

Aziziya